The Euro Players Tour Championship 2010/2011 – Event 1 (also known as the 2010 Paul Hunter Classic) was a professional minor-ranking snooker tournament that took place between 26 and 29 August 2010 in Fürth, Germany.

Judd Trump won in the final 4–3 against Anthony Hamilton.

Prize fund and ranking points
The breakdown of prize money and ranking points of the event is shown below:
A non ranking EPTC Plate Trophy was added to European PTC's for player that went out early to get a trophy and money that would not count towards the rankings.

1 Only professional players can earn ranking points.
 A new non-ranking EPTC Plate Trophy was added for the player than exited the main event early.
 The prize money earned from the Plate Trophy does not qualify for inclusion in the Order of Merit.

Main draw

Preliminary rounds

Round 1
Best of 7 frames

Round 2
Best of 7 frames

Main rounds

Top half

Section 1

Section 2

Section 3

Section 4

Bottom half

Section 5

Section 6

Section 7

Section 8

Finals

Final

Century breaks

 143  Barry Hawkins
 136, 101  Michael White
 134  Michael Wasley
 133, 116  Shaun Murphy
 128  Stuart Bingham
 128  Neil Robertson
 127, 103  Anthony McGill
 122, 114, 101  Jack Lisowski
 120, 100  Gerard Greene
 117  Mark Davis
 117  Jamie Cope
 116, 104  Jamie Jones
 113, 104  Jimmy White
 113  Bjorn Haneveer

 113  Mark Williams
 112  David Morris
 111  Mitchell Mann
 111  Kyren Wilson
 110, 101  Andrew Higginson
 110  Alfie Burden
 109, 102  Anthony Hamilton
 109  Christopher Henry
 108, 105  Ricky Walden
 108  Judd Trump
 107  Alan McManus
 105  Dave Harold
 104  Dominic Dale
 100  Patrick Einsle

References

2010
1 Euro
2010 in German sport

sv:Euro Players Tour Championship 2010/2011#Euro Players Tour Championship 1